Barbo is a surname. Notable people with the surname include:

Antonio Gil Y'Barbo (1729–1809), pioneering settler of Nacogdoches, Texas
Giovanni Barbo (died 1547), Italian Roman Catholic prelate
Franz Engelbert Barbo von Waxenstein (1664–1706), Slovenian nobleman
Josef Anton Barbo von Waxenstein (1863–1930), Slovenian aristocrat, politician, landowner, and member of the Imperial Council of Austria-Hungary
Joseph Emanuel Barbo von Waxenstein (1825–1879), Slovenian politician and aristocrat
Ludovico Barbo (1381–1443), Venetian Roman Catholic bishop
Marco Barbo (1420–1491), Venetian cardinal of the Roman Catholic Church
Pantaleone Barbo, diplomat of the Venetian Republic
Pietro Barbo (Pope Paul II), Pope from 30 August 1464 to his death in 1471

See also 
Barbo Manor, an 18th-century manor-house in Slovenia
Barbo von Waxenstein, a Slovenian noble family of Italian origin